Angana Bose is a Bengali theatre and film actress. She acted in the 2010 Bengali film Shukno Lanka.

Career 
Bose started her acting career in the Bengali theatre group Aarabdha Natya Vidyalay, which was directed by Tripti Mitra. In the play Abhigyan Shakuntalam, she acted in the role of Priyamvada. In 2010 she acted in the Bengali film Shukno Lanka opposite Mithun Chakraborty. She was also a member of the Bengali theatre group Gandhar. She acted in the lead role of Vasantasena in the Shomikkhon theatre group's play Mrichchakatika.

Works

Films 
 Shukno Lanka (2010)

Plays 
 With Aarabdha Natya Vidyalay (theatre group)
 Raktakarabi
 Abhigyan Shakuntalam 
 Bish-Brikkho

 With Gandhar theatre group
 Bhamma

 With Shomikkhon theatre group
 Mrichchakatika

also

References

External links 
  (web archive copy of 10 February 2011)

Actresses in Bengali cinema
Living people
Bengali theatre personalities
Indian stage actresses
21st-century Indian actresses
Year of birth missing (living people)
Indian film actresses